Charon (also spelled "Charogne") is an unincorporated community in Vermilion Parish, Louisiana, United States. It is part of the Abbeville Micropolitan Statistical Area.

Charon is located at  (30.021593, -92.023178) at the intersection of Louisiana highways 338 and 339, north of the town of Erath, and consists of the southern part of the LeBlanc Community.

References

External links
 Vermilion Parish Tourist Commission
 Vermilion Historical Society

Acadiana
Unincorporated communities in Vermilion Parish, Louisiana
Unincorporated communities in Louisiana